Epiprinus is a genus of plant of the family Euphorbiaceae first described as a genus in 1854. It is native to Indochina, Sumatra, southern China, and the Indian Subcontinent.

Species
 Epiprinus balansae (Pax & K.Hoffm.) Gagnep. - Vietnam
 Epiprinus lanceifolius Croizat - Vietnam
 Epiprinus malayanus Griff. - Myanmar, Thailand, Peninsular Malaysia, Sumatra
 Epiprinus mallotiformis (Müll.Arg.) Croizat - southern India
 Epiprinus poilanei Gagnep. - Vietnam
 Epiprinus siletianus (Baill.) Croizat - Hainan, Yunnan, Assam, Laos, Myanmar, Thailand, Vietnam

References

Epiprineae
Euphorbiaceae genera